DDB1- and CUL4-associated factor 11 also known as WD Repeat Domain 23 (WDR23) is a protein that in humans is encoded by the DCAF11 gene.

DCAF11 is a WD40 repeat protein, containing seven repeats of the closed circular solenoid protein domain WD40.
The WDR23 locus is highly conserved from C. elegans to humans.
DCAF11/WDR23 is the E3 ligase that specifically targets proteins for degradation via ubiquitination.
WDR-23 exists in two spatially distinct isoforms produced by alternative splicing, a cytoplasmic WDR-23A and nuclear WDR-23B. Nuclear and cytoplasmic versions of WDR-23 have distinct roles.

Dcaf11 is required for the alternative lengthening of telomeres in mouse embryos especially at the 2C and four-cell stages of cleavage. The direct binding of DCAF11 in the region of distal enhancer of Zscan4 gene facilitates KAP1 removal by ubiquitination-mediated degradation, leading to a lower level of the repressive H3K9me3 marks and thus activates 2C-specific gene Zscan4.

References

Further reading 

 
 
 
 
 

EC 6.3.2
Protein tandem repeats